Merivale or Parkvale is a suburb of Tauranga, in the Bay of Plenty Region of New Zealand's North Island.

The suburb was established after World War II, when six family farms, including the Merrivale Estate, were purchased by developers and subdivided.

Local residents and organisations refer to the area as Merivale. However, some maps refer to the area as Parkvale, and New Zealand Police and Fire and Emergency New Zealand dispatchers often follow these maps. The agencies officially recognise both names.

Demographics

Yatton Park had a population of 2,634 at the 2018 New Zealand census, an increase of 396 people (17.7%) since the 2013 census, and an increase of 369 people (16.3%) since the 2006 census. There were 795 households, comprising 1,344 males and 1,290 females, giving a sex ratio of 1.04 males per female. The median age was 29.4 years (compared with 37.4 years nationally), with 720 people (27.3%) aged under 15 years, 621 (23.6%) aged 15 to 29, 1,029 (39.1%) aged 30 to 64, and 261 (9.9%) aged 65 or older.

Ethnicities were 55.8% European/Pākehā, 41.2% Māori, 13.0% Pacific peoples, 9.3% Asian, and 1.5% other ethnicities. People may identify with more than one ethnicity.

The percentage of people born overseas was 18.8, compared with 27.1% nationally.

Although some people chose not to answer the census's question about religious affiliation, 47.7% had no religion, 31.8% were Christian, 6.8% had Māori religious beliefs, 1.8% were Hindu, 1.0% were Muslim, 0.5% were Buddhist and 3.4% had other religions.

Of those at least 15 years old, 216 (11.3%) people had a bachelor's or higher degree, and 411 (21.5%) people had no formal qualifications. The median income was $22,800, compared with $31,800 nationally. 87 people (4.5%) earned over $70,000 compared to 17.2% nationally. The employment status of those at least 15 was that 807 (42.2%) people were employed full-time, 303 (15.8%) were part-time, and 117 (6.1%) were unemployed.

Education

References

Suburbs of Tauranga